Hughes is a given name. Notable people with the name include:

 Hughes Cleaver (1892–1980), Canadian politician
 Hughes Eng, Canadian community activist
 Hughes Rudd (1921–1992), American television journalist and news correspondent
 Hughes Winborne, American film editor